The Ocoee Christian Church is a historic Carpenter Gothic church in Ocoee, Florida. It is located at 15 South Bluford Avenue. On March 28, 1997, it was added to the U.S. National Register of Historic Places.

The church is affiliated with the Christian Church (Disciples of Christ) and is believed to be the oldest church of that denomination in continuous use in Florida.

References

External links

History of Ocoee Christian Church

Churches on the National Register of Historic Places in Florida
Carpenter Gothic church buildings in Florida
Christian Church (Disciples of Christ) congregations
Churches in Orange County, Florida
National Register of Historic Places in Orange County, Florida
Ocoee, Florida
Churches completed in 1891
1891 establishments in Florida